Llanelian may refer to:

Saint Elian (Wales), saint who founded a church in North Wales around the year 450
Llanelian Road, home field for Colwyn Bay F.C.
Llanelian-yn-Rhos, a former civil parish in Conwy County Borough

See also
 Llaneilian, a village in Anglesey.